Saint-Vincent-d'Autéjac (before 2014: Saint-Vincent; Languedocien: Sent Vincent d'Antejac) is a commune in the Tarn-et-Garonne department in the Occitanie region in southern France.

See also
Communes of the Tarn-et-Garonne department

References

Communes of Tarn-et-Garonne